The All-Pac-12 Women's basketball team is an annual Pac-12 Conference honor bestowed on the best players in the conference following every college basketball season. Pac-12 coaches select 15 players for one all-conference team. The first year 1986-87, the conference recognized players as two five-woman teams, followed by one 12-woman first team from 1987 through 2007.  For two years in 2008 & 2009, there were three five-woman teams selected.

On the last day of the conference regular season, Pac-12 coaches submit their votes and are allowed to vote for their own players. Each all-conference team member receives an award. Players who are not placed on the team, but received at least one vote, earn honorable mention.

Selections

1987–1989

1990–1999

2000–2009

2010–2019

2020–present

See also
List of All-Pac-12 Conference men's basketball teams

References

Pac-12 Conference women's basketball
All-Pac-12 Conference women's basketball teams